Bernhard Dernburg (17 July 1865 – 14 October 1937) was a German liberal politician and banker. He served as the secretary for Colonial Affairs and head of the Imperial Colonial Office from May 1907 to 9 June 1910, and as the minister of Finance and vice-chancellor of Germany from 17 April to 20 June 1919.

Background and banking career

Born in Darmstadt in the Grand Duchy of Hesse, Bernhard Dernburg was the son of publisher and politician Friedrich Dernburg (1833–1911), a member of the National Liberal Party, belonging to a distinguished Jewish family. Friedrich Dernburg had converted to Lutheranism and married Luise Stahl, the daughter of a Lutheran minister. Bernhard Dernburg was a Lutheran. He made a career in banking, including at the Deutsche Bank, and became Director of Deutsche Treuhand-Gesellschaft in 1889. He subsequently joined the management of the Bank für Handel und Industrie (Darmstadt). In 1901, he founded the Deutsch-Luxemburgische Bergwerks- und Hütten-AG together with Hugo Stinnes, which became one of the largest companies in its field. He served as a board member of a number of large industrial companies.

Political career
In 1906, Dernburg entered politics as Prussian Representative at the Federal Council. In 1907, he was appointed Secretary of State for Colonial Affairs and head of the Imperial Colonial Office. As Secretary, he pursued a reformist course in German colonial policy.

Dernburg resigned from this post in 1910.  During 1914 and 1915, while Germany was at war with Britain but the USA was still neutral, Dernburg was based in the United States and represented German viewpoints in the propaganda campaign against Britain.

Following the First World War, he co-founded the liberal German Democratic Party, served as a member of its national board, and was elected to the Weimar National Assembly. From 17 April to 20 June 1919, he served in the cabinet of Philipp Scheidemann as Federal Minister of Finance and Vice Chancellor.

He was a member of the Reichstag, representing the German Democratic Party, from 1920 to 1930. He died in Berlin on 14 October 1937.

Publications
Koloniale Finanzprobleme, 1907
Koloniale Lehrjahre, 1907
Südwestafrikanische Eindrücke, 1909
Industrielle Fortschritte in den Kolonien, 1909

References

Further reading

Press, Steven (2021). Blood and Diamonds: Germany's Imperial Ambitions in Africa. Cambridge, MA: Harvard University Press. ISBN 9780674916494.

External links

 
 Bernhard Dernburg in den Akten der Reichskanzlei
 

1865 births
1937 deaths
Politicians from Darmstadt
People from the Grand Duchy of Hesse
German Lutherans
German people of Jewish descent
German Democratic Party politicians
Members of the Prussian House of Lords
Finance ministers of Germany
Vice-Chancellors of Germany
Members of the Weimar National Assembly
Members of the Reichstag of the Weimar Republic